Tallmadge may refer to one of the following people:

John Tallmadge, American nature writer
Benjamin Tallmadge (1754–1835), American soldier and politician; a US Representative from Connecticut
Nathaniel P. Tallmadge (1795–1864), a United States Senator from New York
James Tallmadge Jr. (1778–1853), a United States Representative from New York
Frederick A. Tallmadge (1792–1869), American politician, US Representative from New York
Matthias B. Tallmadge (1774–1819), American politician, lawyer, and judge in New York state
Thomas Tallmadge (1876–1940), American architect

Tallmadge may refer to one of the following places:
Tallmadge Township, Michigan
Tallmadge, Ohio
Tallmadge may also refer to:
Tallmadge Amendment

See also
Talmage (disambiguation)
Talmadge (disambiguation)